The Kansas City Spartans are a team of the Women's Football Alliance who began play in the 2010 WFA season.  Based in Kansas City, Kansas, the Spartans play their home games on the campus of Shawnee Mission North High School in nearby Shawnne Mission.

The Spartans are one of two WFA teams in the Kansas City metropolitan area, with the Spartans playing on the Kansas side and the Kansas City Tribe playing in Kansas City, Missouri.

Season-By-Season

|-
|2010 || 3 || 5 || 0 || 3rd American Midwest || --
|-
|2011 || 3 || 5 || 0 || 4th American Midwest || --
|-
|2012* || 1 || 3 || 0 || 3rd WFA National 11 || --
|-
!Totals || 7 || 13 || 0
|colspan="2"| 

* = Current standing

2010

Season schedule

2011

Standings

Season schedule

2012

Season schedule

External links 
Kansas City Spartans website
Women's Football Alliance website

Women's Football Alliance teams
Sports in the Kansas City metropolitan area
American football teams in Kansas
American football teams established in 2010
2010 establishments in Kansas